Shirley Fry and Doris Hart defeated the defending champions Louise Brough and Margaret duPont in the final, 6–3, 13–11 to win the ladies' doubles tennis title at the 1951 Wimbledon Championships.

Seeds

  Louise Brough /  Margaret duPont (final)
  Shirley Fry /  Doris Hart (champions)
  Barbara Davidson /  Betty Rosenquest (semifinals)
  Beverly Baker /  Nancy Chaffee (semifinals)

Draw

Finals

Top half

Section 1

Section 2

Bottom half

Section 3

Section 4

References

External links

Women's Doubles
Wimbledon Championship by year – Women's doubles
Wimbledon Championships
Wimbledon Championships